Callous ulcer is a chronic nonhealing ulcer with hard indurated base and inelastic margins.  It usually contains unhealthy pale granulation tissue. It may last for months to years and does not show any tendency to heal. These ulcers generally follows neurological problems like leprosy, peripheral nerve injury, or diabetic neuropathy.

See also
 Chronic ulcer

References

Gastrointestinal tract disorders